The Aristocratic Peasant Girl is a 1995 Russian romantic drama film directed by Aleksey Sakharov.

Plot 
A young master visits a neighboring estate. The girl Lisa wants to meet him, but this is prevented by the conflict of their parents. Lisa found out that the master loves to walk in the woods in the morning and early in the morning sets off in search of him.

Cast 
 Elena Korikova as Elizaveta Muromskaya
 Dmitriy Shcherbina as Alexey Berestov
 Leonid Kuravlyov as Grigory Muromsky
 Vasily Lanovoy as Ivan Berestov
 Yekaterina Rednikova as Nastya
 Lyudmila Artemyeva as miss Jackson
 Evgeny Zharikov as Roschin
 Natalya Gvozdikova as Roschina
 Vadim Zakharchenko as  a servant
 Ariadna Shengelaya as Arina Petrovna
 Raisa Ryazanova as Anisya Egorovna

References

External links 
 

1995 films
Mosfilm films
1990s Russian-language films
Russian romantic drama films
1995 romantic drama films
Films based on works by Aleksandr Pushkin